George "Gigi" Tsereteli (born 23 February 1964, in Tbilisi, Georgia) is a member and former vice-speaker of the Parliament of Georgia and the president of Parliamentary Assembly of the Organization for Security and Co-operation in Europe.

Education
1970–1977: Tbilisi N8 Musical School
1970–1980: Tbilisi N55 Secondary School
1980–1986: State Medical University, School of Medicine
1986 - 1987: Tbilisi Central Republican Hospital - internship
1987–1989: Institute of the Clinical and Experimental Neurology, residency – MD (neurologist)
1995 - 2000: Tbilisi State University, School of Law - LLM
2005 - Boston University School of Public Health, economics and financing for international health - certificate

Career
1989 – 1993: Hospital of the Clinical and Experimental Neurology, neurologist, MD
1993– 1995: Private business
1995 – 1996: Governor of Tbilisi Vake District
April 1995 – October 1995: Tbilisi Municipality, first deputy chairman of the Department of Social Affairs
1996–1998:  Tbilisi Municipality, vice-mayor
October 1998 - November 1999: member of Tbilisi City Council, chairman of the majority faction
November 1999 – February 2000: MP, V Parliament of Georgia, chairman of the Committee on Regional Policy and Self-Governance
February 2000 – January 2004: deputy chairman of the Parliament of Georgia 
November 2003 – January 2004: acting chairman of the Parliament of Georgia
February 2004- 2005: Minister of Labor, Health and Social Protection of Georgia - Deputy prime minister
2004 - 2008: MP, VI Parliament of Georgia,  Member of Parliament of Georgia (Mtatsminda N1 constituency), Parliament of Georgia Committee on Healthcare and Social Issues - chairman
2008 - 2012: MP, VII Parliament of Georgia, deputy chairman
2009 - 2011: European Parliamentary Forum on Population and Development - vice-president
2011 - 2013: European Parliamentary Forum on Population and Development- president
2012 to present: Vice-president, OSCE Parliamentary Assembly
2012-to present: MP, VIII Parliament of Georgia. Vice-chairman, Committee on Healthcare and Social Affairs. Foreign Affairs Committee member
2017 - 2020: President, OSCE Parliamentary Assembly

Membership
Member - Executive Political Board of the European Georgia — Movement for Liberty party
Chairman - European Georgia Political board

Member - Delegation to the OSCE parliamentary assembly
President - EPP and Likeminded Group in the OSCE parliamentary assembly
Member - European Parliamentary Forum on Population and Development
Member - USA caucus in the Parliament of Georgia
Member - Friendship Group with the Parliament of Sweden

Personal life
Married, with two children.

References

 

Boston University School of Public Health alumni
Members of the Parliament of Georgia
1964 births
Living people
Tbilisi State University alumni
Health ministers of Georgia
Labour ministers of Georgia
Social affairs ministers of Georgia